The W J Healy Stakes is a Tattersall's Racing Club Group 3 quality handicap race for Thoroughbred horses run over a distance of 1200 metres at Eagle Farm Racecourse, Brisbane, Australia in June.  Total prize money is A$175,000.

History

The race is named in honour of W.J. Healy who was the longest serving President of Tattersall's (1932-1953).

Grade
1992–1996 - Listed Race
1997 onwards - Group 3

Name
1979–1989 - W. J. Healy Stakes
1990–2004 - Mercedes-Benz Stakes
2005 - Carlton Draught Stakes
2006–2014 - W. J. Healy Stakes
2015 - Tattersall's 150th Anniversary Stakes Handicap
2016 - W. J. Healy Stakes

Records
The race record time of 1:08.68 was set by Hay List in 2010.

Venue
In 2015, the event was held at Gold Coast Racecourse due to track reconstruction at Eagle Farm.

Winners

 2022 - Juan Diva
 2021 - Away Game
 2020 - ‡race not held
 2019 - Brave Song
 2018 - Spright
 2017 - Burning Passion
 2016 - Into The Red
 2015 - Dothraki
 2014 - Big Money
 2013 - Howmuchdoyouloveme
 2012 - River Lad
 2011 - Pinwheel
 2010 - Hay List
 2009 - News Alert
 2008 - Nuclear Medicine
 2007 - The Jackal
 2006 - Natural Destiny
 2005 - Poetic Papal
 2004 - Lamond
 2003 - Super Elegant
 2002 - Jar Jar Binks
 2001 - Citichy
 2000 - El Mirada
 1999 - Marstic
 1998 - Quality Kingdom
 1997 - Blazing Reality
 1996 - Cangronde
 1995 - Dancing Dynamite
 1994 - Sublimate
 1993 - Capestad
 1992 - Blalocks Bull
 1991 - Tinys Finito
 1990 - McGintys Crown
 1989 - Clay Hero
 1988 - Lots Of Rule
 1987 - My Arctic Wolf
 1986 - Between Ourselves
 1985 - Kelly's Pool
 1984 - Faunus
 1983 - Toy Pindarri
 1982 - Ideal Planet
 1981 - Grey Sapphire
 1980 - Hit It Benny
 1979 - Painted Red

‡ Not held because of the COVID-19 pandemic

See also
 List of Australian Group races
 Group races

References

External links
 Tattersalls Club (Brisbane)

Horse races in Australia